Shy Kumwenda (born 24 October 1978) is a Zambian retired football striker.

References

1978 births
Living people
Zambian footballers
Zambia international footballers
Zamsure F.C. players
ZESCO United F.C. players
Nakambala Leopards F.C. players
Association football forwards